Throwing the Game is the second full-length album by Lucky Boys Confusion, and their first on a major label. The album contains newly recorded versions of songs from Growing Out of It and The Soapbox Spectacle, plus five new songs.

Track listing
 "Breaking Rules" – 3:26
 "40/80" – 4:18
 "Fred Astaire" – 3:58
 "Bossman (ft. Beenie Man)" – 3:20
 "Do You Miss Me [Killians]" – 2:50
 "Child's Play" – 3:43
 "Dumb Pop Song / Left of Center" – 3:27
 "Not About Debra" – 3:55
 "Saturday Night" – 3:58
 "Never like This" – 1:09
 "3 to 10 / CB's Caddy Part III" – 3:28
 "City Lights" – 3:40
 "One to the Right" – 3:25
 "Slip" + "Perfect (Hidden Track)"  – 7:55

Personnel
 Kaustubh Pandav – vocals
 Adam Krier – guitars, vocals, Hammond B3 organ, piano
 Ryan Fergus – drums
 Joe Sell – guitars
 Jason Schultejann – bass guitar

Notes
"Do You Miss Me" is a cover of Jocelyn Enriquez's hit single, though with altered lyrics in the verses.
"Perfect", the album's hidden bonus track, begins at approximately 3:47 on Track 14.
 

Lucky Boys Confusion albums
Elektra Records albums
Albums produced by Howard Benson
2001 albums